Bowers Coaches was a bus company based in Chapel-en-le-Frith, Derbyshire, England. The company operated bus and coach services in Cheshire East, Derbyshire and Greater Manchester from 1952 until 2012. In its later years, it was a subsidiary of Centrebus and in 2012 it was merged with the Dove Holes depot of Trent Barton to form High Peak Buses.

History

Bowers Coaches was founded in 1952 by Eric Bower as a coach operator. In 1957, the charter operations of Park Hire Garages & Motors were acquired. It later expanded into local bus operation, particularly after the deregulation of local bus services in 1986. Based in the High Peak district of Derbyshire, it operated services centred on the towns of Buxton, Glossop and New Mills extending to some surrounding areas such as the town of Marple in Stockport and Ashbourne in the Derbyshire Dales. 

In June 2007, the business was purchased by Centrebus who introduced its corporate orange and blue livery, but retained the Bowers trading name. Bowers ceased trading on 31 March 2012 when Centrebus entered a 50/50 joint venture with Wellglade Group that saw the latter's Trent Barton subsidiary combine its Dove Holes operations with those of Bowers to form High Peak Buses.

Although the trading name has ceased to be used, services are still operated using Bowers Coaches operating licence.

Routes
As at March 2012, Bowers Coaches operated 19 routes:
19: Macclesfield to Prestbury
27: Macclesfield to Chelford via Knutsford
42: Buxton to Ashbourne
58: Buxton to Macclesfield
60: Buxton to Disley
61: Buxton to Glossop via New Mills and Hayfield
62: Marple to Hayfield via New Mills
64: Macclesfield to Glossop via New Mills and Hayfield
69: Hayfield to Chapel-en-le-Frith via New Mills
69A: Glossop to Chapel-en-le-Frith via Hayfield
76: Buxton Town Service
189: Buxton to Whaley Bridge via Dove Holes, Chapel-en-le-Frith and Chinley
190: Buxton to Whaley Bridge via Peak Forest, Chapel-en-le-Frithand Chinley
300: Knutsford Town Circular
389: New Mills Town Service
393: Padfield to Shirebrook Park via Glossop
394: Glossop to Stepping Hill Hospital via Marple
411: Ashbourne to Parwich
442: Ashbourne to Buxton via Hartington, Warslow and Longnor

The majority were operated under contract to Derbyshire County Council and other local authorities; however, a number of services such as route 61 between Glossop and Buxton were operated commercially. Until September 2007, the company operated an hourly service between Hayfield and Stockport, Greater Manchester as route 62/62A; however, this service was withdrawn to run only as far as Marple due to falling revenues.

Fleet
As at August 2011, Bowers operated a fleet of 29 buses.

References

External links

1952 establishments in England
2012 disestablishments in England
British companies established in 1952
Former bus operators in Cheshire
Former bus operators in Derbyshire
Former bus operators in Greater Manchester